Manon Johnes (born 17 December 2000) is a Welsh Rugby Union professional player who plays back row for the Wales women's national rugby union team and Bristol Bears. She made her debut for the Wales national squad in 2018, and represented them at the 2021 Women's Six Nations Championship.

Club career 
Johnes first began playing rugby at the age of six, after developing an interest in the sport by watching matches with her father. She started out as the only girl on the team at CRICC Caerdydd, the junior section of Cardiff Quins. At 13, she moved to Cardiff Quins Girls, before joining the Cardiff Blues under-18s, and later the Cardiff Blues senior squad.

Johnes then signed with Bristol Bears, her current club, in 2020.

International career 

Johnes had already established an international career before signing with the Wales senior women's squad. In 2017, she was part of the women's under-18s rugby sevens team that represented Wales and won bronze at the Youth Commonwealth Games in the Bahamas. She would later represent Wales in senior sevens at the 2018 Commonwealth Games in Australia.

She made her debut for Wales against South Africa in 2018 in the autumn series held at Cardiff Arms Park. Wales' 19-5 victory saw Johnes earn her first cap aged just 17.

Johnes then made her Six Nations debut in 2019, with four appearances during the tournament. She has represented Wales at each subsequent Women's Six Nations Championship, and was named 'One to Watch' by BBC Sport ahead of the event in 2021.

Johnes has won 13 caps to date in her rugby career.

Personal life 
Johnes attended Welsh language school Ysgol Gyfun Gymraeg Glantaf in Cardiff before taking a place at Oxford University's St Catherine's College in 2020 to study Geography. In an interview with Oxford University Rugby Club, where she plays during her studies, she explained: "I made a deferred entry to university as I wanted to take a year to balance sports commitments with working in my community, teaching in a Welsh medium primary school and working with ALN pupils."

During the coronavirus pandemic, Johnes would also spend her free time working as an assistant teacher at Ysgol Gwaelod y Garth, on the outskirts of Cardiff.

Johnes says that one the most influential people in her life is her former PE teacher and Wales footballer Gwennan Harries. In an interview with WRU.Wales, she said: "[Harries] has been an immense role model for me, my biggest influence without a doubt. In school it would normally just be the academy boys working out in the gym, but she got me going in there in the mornings, getting into good habits. I’m still in contact with her on a weekly basis, and she’s more of a friend than a teacher now.”

Honours 

 2017 Youth Commonwealth Bronze medallist.
Cardiff Blues Women Player of the Year 2017/2018/2019.

References

External links 

 

2000 births
Living people
Alumni of the University of Oxford
Rugby union players from Cardiff
Welsh female rugby union players
Welsh rugby union players